In Greek mythology, Pylaeus (Ancient Greek: Πύλαιος), son of Lethus, son of Teutamides, descendant of Pelasgus. He was one of the allies to King Priam in the Trojan War; he commanded the Pelasgian contingent together with his brother Hippothous. Pylaeus is hardly ever mentioned separately from his brother; they are said to have fallen in battle together by Dictys Cretensis and to have been buried "in a garden" according to the late Latin poet Ausonius.

Strabo, in his comment on the Homeric passage referenced above, mentions that according to a local tradition of Lesbos, Pylaeus also commanded the Lesbian army and had a mountain on the island named Pylaeus after him.

Pylaeus is also an epithet of Hermes.

Notes

References 

 Dictys Cretensis, from The Trojan War. The Chronicles of Dictys of Crete and Dares the Phrygian translated by Richard McIlwaine Frazer, Jr. (1931-). Indiana University Press. 1966. Online version at the Topos Text Project.
 Dionysus of Halicarnassus, Roman Antiquities. English translation by Earnest Cary in the Loeb Classical Library, 7 volumes. Harvard University Press, 1937-1950. Online version at Bill Thayer's Web Site
 Dionysius of Halicarnassus, Antiquitatum Romanarum quae supersunt, Vol I-IV. . Karl Jacoby. In Aedibus B.G. Teubneri. Leipzig. 1885. Greek text available at the Perseus Digital Library.
 Homer, The Iliad with an English Translation by A.T. Murray, Ph.D. in two volumes. Cambridge, MA., Harvard University Press; London, William Heinemann, Ltd. 1924. . Online version at the Perseus Digital Library.
 Homer, Homeri Opera in five volumes. Oxford, Oxford University Press. 1920. . Greek text available at the Perseus Digital Library.
 Strabo, The Geography of Strabo. Edition by H.L. Jones. Cambridge, Mass.: Harvard University Press; London: William Heinemann, Ltd. 1924. Online version at the Perseus Digital Library.
 Strabo, Geographica edited by A. Meineke. Leipzig: Teubner. 1877. Greek text available at the Perseus Digital Library.

People of the Trojan War
Pelasgians